Neha Singh Rathore is a folk singer. She questions and satires on inflation, corruption, poverty and failures of the government through her songs. Neha Singh Rathore is a resident of Kaimur district of Bihar . Her songs Bihar Me Ka Ba?, UP Me Ka Ba? And UP me ka ba? Part 2 became quite viral. She sings in Bhojpuri language.

Early life
Neha Singh Rathore was born in the year 1997 in a middle-class family in Kaimur district of Bihar . Neha became a public figure when one of her folk songs was composed on "Allahabad University", and went viral as well as herself in controversies. And after that a song “Rojgar Deba Ki Karba Drama” was released and went viral on YouTube, and this song was made for the unemployed youth of Bihar and UP.

Controversy
Neha Singh Rathore came into controversy when she satirized the Yogi government during the Corona period by singing that UP me Ka Ba? Through this, she had raised serious issues like Corona period system, Hathras incident etc.

Neha Singh Rathore courted controversy for the second time when her song UP Mein Ka Ba? Part 2 sang, satirising the Dixit family incident in Kanpur Dehat even though the perpetrator was promptly convicted by the UP administration after the incident. After this the police handed over the notice to her.

References

External links 

 Neha Singh Rathore YouTube Channel

1997 births
Living people
Bhojpuri-language singers